James Roumanos (Arabic: جيمس رومانوس) (born 10 August 1999) is a Lebanon international rugby league footballer who plays as a  or  forward.

He previously played for the Manly-Warringah Sea Eagles in the National Rugby League.

Career
Roumanos made his international debut for Lebanon in their 56-14 loss to Fiji in the 2019 Pacific Test.

On 31 August 2021, he was one of twelve players who were told by Canterbury that they would not be offered a contract for the 2022 season and would be released at seasons end.

In round 25 of the 2022 NRL season, Roumanos made his first grade debut off the bench for the Manly-Warringah Sea Eagles against the Canterbury-Bankstown Bulldogs in a 21-20 loss. He made 3 runs for 39 metres and 8 tackles in 9 minutes.

He signed a contract for Wests Tigers for the 2023 NRL season.

References

External links

1999 births
Living people
Australian rugby league players
Australian people of Lebanese descent
Blacktown Workers players
Lebanon national rugby league team players
Rugby league second-rows
Rugby league locks
Rugby league players from Sydney
Manly Warringah Sea Eagles players
Western Suburbs Magpies NSW Cup players